Finchdean is a rural hamlet in the East Hampshire district of Hampshire, England. It lies on the Hampshire/West Sussex border, 1.7 miles (2.7 km) east of Horndean.

The origin of the place-name is from the Old English word finc and denu meaning  valley of the finch (or of a man called Finc); the place-name appears as Finchesdene in 1167. The village has a United Reformed Church in a building that was perviously a stables before being converted to a chapel in 1830.

The nearest railway station is 1.1 miles (1.8 km) south of the village, at Rowlands Castle (where according to the Post Office the 2011 Census population was included).

Finchdean has retained its village pound.

References

External links
 Village pound

Villages in Hampshire